Yücel İldiz (born 4 June 1953) is a UEFA Pro Licensed Turkish football manager.

He has managed several clubs around Turkey, most notably Malatyaspor and Orduspor.

References

Yücel İldiz yeniden Karabükspor'da‚ fanatik.com.tr, 29 December 2015

1953 births
Living people
Turkish football managers
Hatayspor managers
Diyarbakırspor managers
Adanaspor managers
Adana Demirspor managers
Şanlıurfaspor managers
Malatyaspor managers
Orduspor managers
Samsunspor managers
Kardemir Karabükspor managers
Mersin İdman Yurdu managers
Yeni Malatyaspor managers
Denizlispor managers
Süper Lig managers